Akhenaton, Akhnaton, Akhnaten or Akhenaten may refer to:

 Akhenaten, Pharaoh of the Eighteenth dynasty of Egypt
 Akhnaton (play), 1937 play by Agatha Christie about the pharaoh
 Akhnaten (opera), a 1983 Philip Glass opera about the pharaoh
 Akhenaten (verse novel), a 1992 poem by Dorothy Porter
 Akhenaton (rapper) (b. 1968), stage name of French rapper Philippe Fragione
 Akhenaten, Dweller in Truth, 1985 novel by Naguib Mahfouz
 Akhenaten: Son of the Sun, 1986 novel by Moyra Caldecott
Akhnaton (music venue), in Amsterdam

See also
 Akhaten, a planet in the British science fiction television series Doctor Who